Federalist No. 9 is an essay by Alexander Hamilton, the ninth of The Federalist Papers. It was published on November 21, 1787 under the pseudonym Publius, the name under which all The Federalist papers were published. Federalist No. 9 is titled "The Union as a Safeguard Against Domestic Faction and Insurrection".

Connection to other Federalist papers
The same subject is continued in the subsequent paper by James Madison, Federalist No. 10. Similar to Federalist No. 51, this paper emphasizes the importance of establishing a system of checks and balances in order to ensure that the government is intact and operating smoothly.

Publius's argument
A major aspect of Federalist No. 9 is Hamilton's response to the common Anti-Federalist argument based on the theories of Montesquieu, who wrote famously in his The Spirit of the Laws that "It is natural for a republic to have only a small territory; otherwise it cannot long subsist." The Anti-Federalist took his arguments to mean that the federal Union was bound to fail. Hamilton responded that if Montesquieu were taken literally, then since he was thinking of dimensions far smaller even than those of the states, the Americans would have to split themselves into "an infinity of little, jealous, clashing tumultuous commonwealths."

Hamilton contends that the confederated federal system described in the proposed Constitution would not suffer as Montesquieu predicted because of its de-centralized design. He further argues that Montesquieu himself proposed a confederation of republics as the solution.

References

External links 

 Text of The Federalist No. 9: congress.gov

09
Federalist No. 09
1787 essays
1787 in the United States